The  was the ninth season of the Japan Football League, the third tier of the Japanese football league system.

Overview

It was contested by 18 teams, and Sagawa Express won the championship. The club was created before the season by merger of two Sagawa Express corporate clubs from Tokyo and Osaka.

SC Tottori were renamed to Gainare Tottori before the season.

TDK SC and FC Gifu were promoted from Regional leagues by the virtue of their placing in the Regional League promotion series, the former promoted automatically and the latter won the play-off series against Honda Lock.

FC Gifu, Gainare Tottori and Tochigi SC were approved as J. League associate members at the annual meeting in January.

Table

Results

Top scorers

Attendance

Promotion and relegation
No relegation has occurred due to a post-season merger of ALO's Hokuriku and YKK AP into one club named Kataller Toyama.

Fagiano Okayama, New Wave Kitakyushu and MIO Biwako Kusatsu were promoted to JFL from Regional leagues at the end of the season.

References

2007
3